"Like There Ain't No Yesterday" is a song recorded by American country music band  Blackhawk.  It was released in November 1995 as the second single from their album Strong Enough.  It peaked at number 3 on the United States Billboard Hot Country Singles & Tracks, while it was their second number-one hit in Canada.  The song was written by Walt Aldridge and Mark Narmore.

Content
The song's narrator has lost a former lover in the past, but he knows that that was then, and he decides to find someone new, and love her like there ain't no yesterday.

Critical reception
Deborah Evans Price, of Billboard magazine reviewed the song favorably, saying that Paul's voice grabs you and pulls you into this well-written tune "from the a capella opening line." She goes on to say that Robbins and Van Stephenson "add their considerable talents, and the result is one of the best country singles this year."

Chart performance
"Like There Ain't No Yesterday" debuted at number 71 on the Billboard Hot Country Singles & Tracks chart for the week of November 11, 1995, and peaked at number 3 on the week of February 17, 1996. It reached number 1 on the RPM Country Tracks chart in Canada on the week of February 26, 1996.

Year-end charts

References

1995 singles
1995 songs
Blackhawk (band) songs
Songs written by Walt Aldridge
Arista Nashville singles
Song recordings produced by Mark Bright (record producer)